Hirab (also Romanized as Hīrāb; also known as Hīru) is a village in Valanjerd Rural District, in the Central District of Borujerd County, Lorestan Province, Iran. At the 2006 census, its population was 29, in 7 families.

References 

Towns and villages in Borujerd County